The secretary of environment and natural resources  (Filipino: Kalihim ng Kapaligiran at Likas na Yaman) is the head of the Department of Environment and Natural Resources of the Philippines.

List

References

External links
DENR - History
History of the Department of Agriculture: 'DA Then and Now'

 
Environment and Natural Resources
Philippines
Philippines